The Universe of Mojica Marins (original title: O Universo de Mojica Marins) is a 1978 Brazilian short documentary film by Ivan Cardoso. The film features Brazilian filmmaker, director, screenwriter, film and television actor and media personality José Mojica Marins. The film follows Marins (as himself) in public appearances and includes commentary by Marins, as well as his mother and film associates and includes scenes from his films.

Cast
José Mojica Marins	(as himself)
Madame Satã
Nilcemar Leyart

References

External links

Official José Mojica Marins website
Filmes de Ivan Cardoso on Portal Heco de Cinema 

1978 films
Brazilian short documentary films
1970s Portuguese-language films
1970s short documentary films
Documentary films about mass media people